Citibank Vietnam is a bank which set its first footprint in Vietnam in 1975, and then started up a representative office in Hanoi in 1993. A year later, Citi became the first U.S. financial institution licensed for branch opening and full branch establishment in Hanoi a year later. Citi has two branches in Vietnam, one in Hanoi and one in Ho Chi Minh City.

On January 13, 2022, Citigroup announced that it will sell its consumer banking businesses in Vietnam, Malaysia, Thailand, and Indonesia to United Overseas Bank of Singapore.

Products and services

Citi offers banking services including retail banking, corporate banking, investment banking and global transaction services, including trade and treasury services, and securities and fund services.

Digital wallet support
Citibank Vietnam credit cards only support Samsung Pay. Google Pay and Apple Pay are not supported.

See also
List of banks in Vietnam

References

External links

Citi Vietnam (English)

Banks of Vietnam
Citigroup